Víctor Hugo Borja Morca (18 July 1912 – 8 November 1954) was a Mexican basketball player. He competed in the 1936 Summer Olympics.

Career
Born in Guadalajara, Borja was part of the Mexican basketball team, which won the bronze medal in Berlin. He played all seven matches. Later in life he entered the pharmaceutical business and committed suicide in 1954 after his daughter, a diver, died of an infection.

References

External links
 

1912 births
1954 suicides
Basketball players at the 1936 Summer Olympics
Mexican men's basketball players
Olympic basketball players of Mexico
Olympic bronze medalists for Mexico
Sportspeople from Guadalajara, Jalisco
Basketball players from Jalisco
Olympic medalists in basketball
Medalists at the 1936 Summer Olympics
Suicides in Mexico
1954 deaths